The 1995 Air Canada Cup was Canada's 17th annual national midget 'AAA' hockey championship, which was played April 19 – 25, 1995 at Sherbrooke, Quebec.  The Thunder Bay Kings defeated the Red Deer Chiefs in the championship game to win the gold medal. The Gouverneurs de Ste-Foy won the bronze medal. Future National Hockey League players competing in this tournament were Brad Leeb and Derek Morris.

Teams

Round robin

Standings

Scores

Thunder Bay 2 - Red Deer 2
Ste-Foy 4 - Dartmouth 0
Wexford 3 - Magog 0
Ste-Foy 2 - Red Deer 1
Thunder Bay 2 - Magog 1
Dartmouth 4 - Wexford 2
Magog 2 - Ste-Foy 1
Thunder Bay 5 - Wexford 3
Red Deer 8 - Dartmouth 1
Ste-Foy 6 - Wexford 3
Magog 3 - Dartmouth 1
Wexford 2 - Red Deer 1
Thunder Bay 3 - Dartmouth 1
Red Deer 5 - Magog 1
Thunder Bay 3 - Ste-Foy 1

Playoffs

Semi-finals
Thunder Bay 5 - Wexford 1
Red Deer 6 - Ste-Foy 4

Bronze-medal game
Ste-Foy 4 - Wexford 3

Gold-medal game
Thunder Bay 4 - Red Deer 3

Individual awards
Most Valuable Player: David Cinelli (Wexford)
Top Scorer: Jesse Heerema (Thunder Bay)
Top Forward: Josh Lazzari (Red Deer)
Top Defenceman: Derek Morris (Red Deer)
Top Goaltender: David Cinelli (Wexford)
Most Sportsmanlike Player: Bryan Boorman (Red Deer)

See also
Telus Cup

References

External links
Telus Cup Website
Hockey Canada-Telus Cup Guide and Record Book

Telus Cup
Air Canada Cup
Sport in Sherbrooke
AIR CANADA
April 1995 sports events in Canada